Pachat may refer to:
 Pachat-e Charbiyun
 Pachat-e Delita
 Pachat-e Jowkar
 Pachat, Neka